Quchayuq (Quechua qucha lake, -yuq a suffix, "the one with a lake (or lakes)", also spelled Cochayoj) is a mountain in the Bolivian Andes which reaches a height of approximately . It is located in the Chuquisaca Department, Jaime Zudáñez Province, Icla Municipality, northeast of the village of Icla. The Jatun Mayu flows along its southern slope.

References 

Mountains of Chuquisaca Department